The 1916 South Carolina gubernatorial election was held on November 7, 1916, to select the governor of the state of South Carolina. Governor Richard Irvine Manning III faced a strong challenge from former governor Coleman Livingston Blease in the Democratic primary, but Manning won a second two-year term as governor.

Democratic primary
Governor Richard Irvine Manning III ran for a second term, but faced a challenge in the state Democratic primary from former governor Coleman Livingston Blease and Robert Archer Cooper. The progressive reforms initiated by Governor Manning alarmed many of the textile owners who threw their support to Cooper. Blease revived his political coalition of mill workers and sharecroppers and he made political capital out of Manning's use of troops to enforce a court eviction order against strikers at a mill in Anderson. Senator Ben Tillman openly supported the re-election of Governor Manning.

The results of the primary on August 29 had Blease in first place, but just short of a majority necessary to avoid a runoff election. With the elimination of Cooper, the mill executives threw their support to Manning. Indeed, most South Carolinians not already supporting Blease preferred Manning to Blease. Many viewed the election as one of government and misgovernment. Manning eked out a victory in the runoff on September 12 and was essentially elected to a second two-year term because there was nominal opposition in the general election.

General election
The general election was held on November 7, 1916, and Richard Irvine Manning III was re-elected governor of South Carolina without opposition. Turnout increased over the previous gubernatorial election because there was also a presidential election on the ballot.

|-
| 
| colspan=5 |Democratic hold
|-

See also
Governor of South Carolina
List of governors of South Carolina
South Carolina gubernatorial elections

References

"Report of the Secretary of State to the General Assembly of South Carolina.  Part II." Reports and Resolutions of the General Assembly of the State of South Carolina. Volume II. Columbia, South Carolina: 1917, pp. 5–6.

External links
SCIway Biography of Richard Irvine Manning III

Gubernatorial
1916
1916 United States gubernatorial elections
November 1916 events